Suancai (also called suan tsai and Chinese sauerkraut) is a traditional Chinese pickled Chinese cabbage (napa cabbage) or Chinese mustard, used for a variety of purposes. Suancai is a unique form of paocai, due to the ingredients used and the method of production.

History 
In China, the earliest record of Chinese traditional Suan cai production is in the Book of Odes (or Classic of Poetry), dating back to 11th to 7th centuries BC. During that time period, fermented vegetables are used as a sacrifice in the worship ceremony of the ancestors. In the poem Xin Nan Shan, there is the description of how ancient Chinese produce suan cai by pickling gourds:In the midst of the fields are the huts,                    中田有廬、

And along the bounding divisions are gourds.       疆場有瓜。

The fruit(s) is sliced and pickled,                               是剝是菹、

To be presented to our great ancestors,                 獻之皇祖。

That their distant descendant may have long life,  曾孫壽考、

And receive the blessing of Heaven.                       受天之祜。

—Classic of Poetry (translated by Xuepen Sun and Xiaoqian Zheng, in Shi Jing [Book of Odes])In the 7th century BC, the workers building the Great Wall of China lived on cabbages and rice. In order to preserve vegetables in winter, they began adding rice wine to the cabbages, which in turn fermented the cabbages and made the food sour.

A Northern Wei Dynasty (386-534 AD) agricultural book, Ch’i Min Yao Shu, illustrates the detailed procedure of producing 18 types of suan cai using different vegetables. Some of the vegetables are plain while others add salt in the suan cai. This indicates that suan cai were commonly accepted and widely eaten by Chinese people during that time.

Production

Two distinct types of suancai are found in China:
Northern China has used napa cabbage as the traditional vegetable of choice.
Southern and Western China uses the thick stalk varieties of Chinese mustard variety to make suancai.

Production of suancai differs from other paocai in that the vegetable is compressed. This is accomplished by placing a heavyweight such as a large rock on top of the cover of the container so that the Chinese cabbage inside the container is slowly pressed as fermentation takes place. The processing of the vegetable helps to create a distinct flavor.

Suancai is often used in cooking with meat, especially pork. It is said to neutralize the grease of meat.

During wintertime, cabbages, infiltrated by salt, are preserved in jars and crocks to wait for fermentation. The fermentation process will be around one month “at ambient temperature.” There are two main methods for spontaneous fermentation by autochthonous microbiota—homemade and industrial processes. In the fermentation of suancai, salt plays an important role in affecting the growth and metabolism of microbes. The higher the salt concentration, the better quality and flavor for suancai.

Nutrients
Adding nutrients to suan cai can reduce the fermentation time and nitrite content of suan cai, for example, Asp, Thr, Glu, Cys, Tyr, Mg2+, Mn2+ and inosine.

Regional

Muslim regions in China and Taiwan

In Chinese Islamic cuisine, suancai can top off noodle soups, especially beef noodle soup.

Hakka
In Hakka cuisine, suancai (called soen choi in Hakka) is a common pantry staple used in many Hakka dishes, including stir fries.

Hunan
In Hunan, suancai is frequently made with ginger and chilies (typical of Hunan cuisine).

Guangdong and Hong Kong
In Cantonese cuisine, it is served in a small dish, often as an appetizer, and usually free.  Sometimes it can be available in mini-containers on the dining table. There are also Cantonese variations such as salted suancai.

Northeast China

In Northeastern Chinese cuisine, suancai is made from napa cabbage or head cabbage  and has a taste similar to sauerkraut. As part of the cuisine in Manchuria, it is used with dumplings and boiled, or stir fried. More frequently, suancai is used to make suancai and pork stew.

Hot pot
In hot pot cuisine, it is often one of the ingredients.

Sichuan
In Sichuan cuisine, the dish suancai yu uses suancai. This dish is served in a broth.

In Thailand

Suancai has also been incorporated into Thai cuisine, where it is known as phak kat dong (ผักกาดดอง) when only the upper stem and leaf are used'. Most often used in Thai-Chinese dishes, it can also be served as an ingredient in a Thai salad, or as a condiment such as with khao soi, a northern Thai curry-noodle soup. The chopped sour leaf and upper stem is combined with scrambled egg in the dish pak khat dong pat kai. When the dish includes only the main stem and tuber of the cabbage (in the style of zha cai), it is called chee chuan chai in Thai.

In Vietnam
Pickled cabbage or dưa cải chua is a traditional staple in northern Vietnamese cuisine. It is used in dishes such as canh cải chua (sour cabbage soup) or cơm rang dưa bò (fried rice with beef and pickles).

Comparison
Suancai is similar to a fermented-cabbage dish, sauerkraut, which is common in the cuisines of Central and Eastern Europe.

In popular culture
A popular sitcom and namesake song depicting lives in Northeast China, entitled Cui Hua Shang Suancai (翠花, 上酸菜) debuted in 2001, and the phrase Cui Hua Shang Suancai became a popular catch phrase. Cui Hua became synonymous with a person from Northeast China. A company in China registered "Cui Hua" brand packaged suancai. In Vietnam called this traditional dish is "dưa cải muối" derived form the Chinese suan cai. Dưa cải muối often eaten directly or stir-fried with meat (pork, beef, seafood) or cooked in soup.

See also

Sauerkraut – A finely cut raw cabbage fermented by various lactic acid bacteria
Kimchi – a Korean dish made with fermented cabbage in chili peppers

References

External links
A common type of jiecai 芥菜 that is used to make suan cai
A photo series of the process after salting
A photo series containing jiecai harvest and suaicai production
Suancai sold in a tub in Hongkong

Cabbage dishes
Cantonese cuisine
Chinese Islamic cuisine
Chinese pickles
Northeastern Chinese cuisine
Plant-based fermented foods
Vegetable dishes